Tommy Elliot (born 1 March 1941) is a former Scotland international rugby union player.

Rugby Union career

Amateur career

He played for Langholm.

Provincial career

He played for South of Scotland District.

International career

He had 5 caps for Scotland between 1968 and 1970.

He played for a combined Scotland - Ireland side to mark the English rugby union's centenary in 1970. The game against a Wales - England side ended in a 14–14 draw.

References

1941 births
Living people
Langholm RFC players
Rugby union players from Langholm
Scotland international rugby union players
Scottish rugby union players
South of Scotland District (rugby union) players
Rugby union flankers